Tan-1, TAN-1, tan-1, or tan−1 may refer to:

 tan−1y = tan−1(x), sometimes interpreted as arctan(x) or arctangent of x, the compositional inverse of the trigonometric function tangent (see below for ambiguity)
 tan−1x = tan−1(x),  interpreted as (tan(x))−1 =  = cot(x) or cotangent of x, the multiplicative inverse (or reciprocal) of the trigonometric function tangent (see above for ambiguity)
 tan x−1, sometimes interpreted as tan(x−1) = tan(), the tangent of the multiplicative inverse (or reciprocal) of x (see below for ambiguity)
 tan x−1, sometimes interpreted as (tan(x))−1 =  = cot(x) or cotangent of x, the multiplicative inverse (or reciprocal) of the trigonometric function tangent (see above for ambiguity)
Because of ambiguity, the notation arctan(x) or (tan(x))−1, is recommended.

See also
Inverse function
cot−1 (disambiguation)
atan2